Vidya Pradeep is an Indian actress and scientist. She is currently working as a scientist in the United States.  Her films include  Saivam (2014), Pasanga 2 (2015), and  Thadam (2019)

Career
After completing her Master of Science degree in Biotechnology, Vidya Pradeep completed her PhD in Stem Cell Biology at an eye hospital in Chennai. She works on ocular stem cells, and her works are published in "International Journal of Cornea" and "International Journal of Cell Therapy".

She practiced Bharatanatyam during her childhood. While pursuing her PhD, Vidya worked as a model and appeared in several print and television advertisements. Vidya says that her break in to the world of Ads and movies were accidental. She also appeared in the music video for A. R. Rahman's "Aa Bhi Jaa" from his studio album Raunaq alongside Yami Gautam and several other models. Vidya was signed to play a role in a film by Lohithadas, but the film didn't materialise. She was subsequently signed to play a supporting role in Aval Peyar Thamizharasi (2010) and debuted under the name Dhyana. Her next film was Virunthali (2010), where she played the heroine. She was spotted by director A. L. Vijay, who cast her in his successful family drama film, Saivam (2014) to portray Sara Arjun's mother. For the film, she reverted to her original name and put on weight to portray a middle-aged woman. The film and the ensemble cast won positive reviews for its portrayal of a family. She then featured in the action drama, Adhibar (2015) as the lead actress opposite Jeevan. Pradeep then worked on Pandiraj's Pasanga 2 (2015) portraying the mother of a small child. Critics noted that Pradeep added "solidity to the film by coming up with a credible performance" and that she did "commendably well". She worked on the psychological thriller Onnume Puriyala (2016), which made the headlines for becoming the first Tamil film to be remade in German, and played a cameo in Achamindri (2016).

Pradeep made her debut in Kannada with Bangara s/o Bangarada Manushya (2017) opposite Shivarajkumar, and the film opened to very positive reviews. Vidya was highly appreciated by the critics for her acting skills and screen presence. The New Indian Express noted that "Vidya Pradeep doesn’t  stay a glam doll instead proves her talent in acting when called for", while the Deccan Herald says that it is a "fortuitous debut for Vidya Pradeep". In March 2019, she appeared in Thadam with Arun Vijay. Times of India said "Vidya's performance stands out" and The Indian Express stated that "Vidya Pradeep needs a special mention and manages to hold your attention undivided right through as Malar".

Filmography

Web series

Television series

References

External links

Indian film actresses
Actresses in Tamil cinema
Living people
Actresses in Malayalam cinema
Actresses in Kannada cinema
Year of birth missing (living people)